Antony Mitradas (3 November 1913 – 20 February 2017) was an Indian film director who directed films in three languages: Tamil, Malayalam and Sinhalese.

Early life
Mitradas was born in Madurai on 3 November 1913. He did his B.A. Statistics at American College, Madurai. His passion for film direction took him to Calcutta, and he enrolled in an institute run by Mr. Balchandani. There the noted director Ellis R. Dungan had come to deliver a guest lecture.  Dungan was much impressed by Mitradas and recommended him to T. R. Sundaram of Modern Theatres, Salem. Thus he got the opportunity to direct his first film Dayalan starring P. U. Chinnappa in 1941, as soon as he finished his studies at the film institute.

Career
Mitradas' best known films are Baalyasakhi, Avakasi and Pizhaikkum Vazhi. Avakasi was a turning point in the career of Prem Nazir. Duppathage Duka (1956) is the remake of the Tamil hit Ezhai Padum Padu. With the outbreak of the World War II, he felt the necessity to serve the nation. He joined the army and was posted in Singapore and Chittagong during 1942-1945. At the end of the war, he restarted his film career and directed a few films.

Death
He died at the age of 103 on 20 February 2017 at Chennai.

Filmography

See also
List of Sri Lankan films of the 1950s for details of Duppathage Duka

References

External links

1913 births
2017 deaths
20th-century Indian film directors
Tamil film directors
Malayalam film directors
Indian centenarians
Men centenarians
Film directors from Tamil Nadu
Artists from Madurai